Sonneries may refer to:
 The plural of sonnerie, french for ringing, especially in a bell tower or clock
 Sonneries de la Rose+Croix, a piano composition by Erik Satie